Xavier Prather (born May 12, 1994), is an American lawyer and reality television personality. He is the winner of the twenty-third season of the American reality television series Big Brother, becoming the first African-American to win a regular season in the show's twenty-one-year history. In 2022, he appeared as a contestant on The Challenge: USA where he was eliminated during Episode 4.

Outside reality television, Prather is a practicing attorney and a former college basketball player.

Personal life 
Prather was born on May 12, 1994, in Kalamazoo, Michigan. He graduated from Gull Lake High School in 2012, where he stood out as a member of the school's varsity basketball team. He attended Spring Arbor University from 2012 to 2016, earning his Bachelor of Arts in criminal justice. While there, he served as a member of the Spring Arbor Cougars men's basketball team. He went on to attend the Valparaiso University School of Law in 2017, earning his Juris Doctor in 2018. In 2020, he earned his second J.D. from Marquette University Law School. He has been an attorney at Reinhart Boerner Van Deuren s.c. since September 2020. He currently resides in Milwaukee, Wisconsin.

Big Brother
CBS announced Prather as a HouseGuest for Big Brother 23 on July 1, 2021. During his time in the house, he became a member of the six-person alliance named "The Cookout." The alliance, consisting of only African-Americans, was created to ensure the crowning of the first black winner of a regular season of Big Brother. During the September 9 double-eviction episode, the last non-Cookout HouseGuest was evicted, leaving the final six composed solely of members of The Cookout.

On September 29, 2021, Prather won the final Head of Household competition of the season, evicting HouseGuest Azah Awasum and earning a spot in the final two. He was crowned the winner of the season by a unanimous vote, defeating Derek Frazier and earning the $750,000 prize. He is the third player in the history of the show to win by a unanimous vote in a regular season, following Dan Gheesling and Cody Calafiore.

The Challenge: USA 
On June 8, 2022, CBS announced Prather as a contestant on The Challenge: USA. He competed alongside former Big Brother HouseGuests from his season and past seasons. Attempts for the former HouseGuests to work together ultimately failed and during the July 27, 2022 episode, he and his partner Shan Smith were thrown into elimination against Justine Nbdia and fellow Big Brother alum David Alexander. Prather and Smith lost the elimination and were eliminated from the competition.

Filmography

References 

1994 births
African-American lawyers
Big Brother (American TV series) winners
The Challenge (TV series) contestants
People from Kalamazoo, Michigan
Lawyers from Milwaukee
Living people
Marquette University Law School alumni
Spring Arbor Cougars men's basketball players
Valparaiso University School of Law alumni